Ericameria pinifolia is a species of flowering shrubs in the family Asteraceae known by the common name pinebush. This plant is native to southern California and northern Baja California.

Ericameria pinifolia is found in scrub and chaparral from the inland Peninsular and western Transverse Ranges foothills to the Colorado Desert. It is a green, hairless shrub sometimes as much as 300 cm (10 feet) tall. It is covered in clustered needle-like leaves each 1-4 centimeters (0.4-1.6 inches) long which at first glance look like very young pine needles. The leaves are fleshier than true needles and the plant is not closely related to the pines.

Atop each of the many erect branches is an inflorescence of small whitish flower heads. The plant blooms twice per year, producing single-head inflorescences in the spring and inflorescences with many smaller heads in the fall. Each head contains 3–10 ray florets and 11–25 disc florets. The fruit is an achene with a bright white, red, or tan pappus.

References

External links
Jepson Manual Treatment — Ericameria pinifolia
United States Department of Agriculture Plants Profile: Ericameria pinifolia (pinebush)
Ericameria pinifolia — Calphotos Photo gallery, University of California

pinifolia
Flora of California
Flora of Baja California
Natural history of the California chaparral and woodlands
Natural history of the Peninsular Ranges
Natural history of the Transverse Ranges
Plants described in 1873
Taxa named by Asa Gray